Mini Motorways is a puzzle strategy game released by New Zealand studio Dinosaur Polo Club. It is a follow-up to their 2015 video game Mini Metro. The game tasks the player with creating roads to connect coloured houses to buildings.

The game was released on Apple Arcade in September 2019, on Microsoft Windows in July 2021, and on Nintendo Switch in May 2022.

Gameplay 
The game plays similarly to Mini Metro, its predecessor, except it involves following a grid-like system to build road networks instead of rail networks. The game consists of drawing roads to link houses (which contain cars) to buildings of identical colours (red to red, yellow to yellow, etc.). New buildings and houses appear randomly as the game progresses. The buildings have pins which the cars of the correct color must collect. The score is the number of pins that have been collected. If too many pins accumulate on a building (seven for square buildings and ten for circular buildings), a timer is set. Once a building's timer is full, the game is over. Vehicles reaching the destination will reduce the progression of the timer slightly, and if the number of pins on the building is not greater than capacity, the timer will deplete by itself. If the timer is reduced completely, it will split back up into standard pins. Vehicles will prioritize buildings with timers to help deal with them.

After each week, the player may choose between two upgrade choices, which could include special tools. Both choices will always provide extra road tiles, and one choice will always provide a special tool. Sometimes one of the choices will just be road tiles. Special tools include:

 Bridges and Tunnels - A stretch of road across water or through a mountain, respectively. Only one is used for a stretch of road across an obstacle, no matter how long the road is.
 Traffic Lights - Alternates the flow of traffic.
 Roundabout - A 3x3 circle of one-way road (no road tiles needed to build) to help improve efficiency of an intersection.
 Motorway - A singular stretch of road that links point A directly to point B, passing over everything, with the exception of mountains, on its way. The player can shift the Motorway's route (without affecting gameplay) by dragging its shield, allowing the player to see what's going on below it.
If a special tool is deleted, it returns to the inventory once all existing traffic has completed their journey (or have an alternative route). Traffic lights and the ends of motorways can be moved without having to delete and reposition them.

Reception 

Mini Motorways received "generally favorable" reviews according to review aggregator Metacritic. Nathan Reinauer from TouchArcade praised the game's soundtrack and minimalistic art style, both similar to Mini Metro. Pocket Gamer liked the accessibility options, saying that the colorblind mode was a "nice touch", while criticizing the frantic pace of gameplay. Eurogamer enjoyed the soundtrack, describing it as "a chilled tumbler of pips and muttering hums and clicks and whistles and honks". VG247 thought that the game was well designed to avoid frustrating the player, "There’s an intricate, impossible-feeling balance to this game; it is fiendishly difficult and filled with tactical nuance... and yet it is also joyously mellow". Rock Paper Shotgun felt the audio design was informative, singling out the car horns as a helpful sound, "Cues like this help alert you to potential problems in your network, but also let you keep a calm head, and I rarely felt stressed or overwhelmed when my cities went awry".

The traffic light upgrade was criticized for its lack of usefulness in gameplay, often making the traffic worse.

Notes

References

External links 
 

2019 video games
Apple Arcade games
Business simulation games
IOS games
MacOS games
Nintendo Switch games
Puzzle video games
Single-player video games
Strategy video games
Video games developed in New Zealand
Indie video games
Video games scored by Richard Vreeland
Windows games
Independent Games Festival winners
Game Developers Choice Award winners